Erinacea is a small genus of flowering plants in the family Fabaceae.

References

External links

Genisteae
Fabaceae genera